Michael Dodd (born August 20, 1957) is an American retired professional beach volleyball player who attended San Diego State University.  With his partner Mike Whitmarsh he won the silver medal in the men's inaugural beach volleyball tournament at the 1996 Summer Olympics.  Since winning silver in the 1996 Atlanta Olympics, he has worked the Olympic Games of 2000 as a beach analyst and 2004 as an indoor analyst for NBC. In 2008 Dodd coached AVP stars Jake Gibb and Sean Rosenthal in the Beijing Olympics. Dodd also captained Team USA to a win over Brazil's best players in the inaugural AVP World Challenge in 2009.

Born and raised in Manhattan Beach, California and a Mira Costa High School alumnus, Dodd won five Manhattan Beach Open titles. In 2009, he became the first person to coach the men's and women's champions of the same Manhattan Beach Open (Gibb and Rosenthal and Nicole Branagh and Elaine Youngs). Dodd was named AVP Sportsman of the Year in 1994 and 1996 and AVP Most Inspirational Player three times in a row from 1995–1997. Since earning his AAA volleyball rating at age 16, Dodd has represented the U.S. National Team and played professionally in Italy in addition to his AVP career as a player and coach. He is in the California Beach Volleyball Association Hall of Fame.

One of beach volleyball's all-time greats, Dodd won 75 titles in his illustrious 18-year career and a silver medal in the first Olympics to feature beach volleyball. He also played basketball while at San Diego State for four years; in fact, he was drafted by the hometown San Diego Clippers in 1979 (9th round, 176th overall pick), but ultimately decided that playing competitive volleyball was his calling because basketball is too physical for him.

Awards and honors
 AVP Best Defensive Player 1994, 1995, 1996, 1997
 AVP Best Spiker 1989
 AVP Most Inspirational 1995, 1996, 1997
 AVP Sportsman of the Year 1994, 1996

References

External links
 
 
 Player profile at goaztecs.com

1957 births
Living people
Beach volleyball players at the 1996 Summer Olympics
Olympic beach volleyball players of the United States
Olympic medalists in beach volleyball
Sportspeople from Manhattan Beach, California
San Diego Clippers draft picks
San Diego State Aztecs men's basketball players
San Diego State Aztecs men's volleyball players
American men's beach volleyball players
Medalists at the 1996 Summer Olympics
American men's basketball players
20th-century American people
21st-century American people
Mira Costa High School alumni